Evan Frederick Morgan, 2nd Viscount Tredegar, FAGS, FIL (13 July 1893 – 27 April 1949) was a Welsh poet and author. On 3 March 1934, he succeeded to the title of 6th Baronet Morgan, 4th Baron Tredegar, and 2nd Viscount Tredegar, after the death of his father.

Life
He was the son of Courtenay Morgan, 1st Viscount Tredegar, of Tredegar Park, Monmouthshire, Wales, and Lady Katharine Carnegie.  The 13th Duke of Bedford described the Tredegar family as "the oddest family I have ever met".

The 2nd Viscount was educated at Eton College and Christ Church, Oxford University. While working as private secretary to a government minister, W. C. Bridgeman, in 1917, he became friendly with another Oxford man, the poet Robert Graves, who had been a school friend of Evan's cousin, Raymond Rodakowski. They shared an interest in both poetry and the supernatural.

A Roman Catholic convert, Morgan was a Chamberlain of the Sword and Cape to Popes Benedict XV and Pius XI. An accomplished occultist, he was hailed by Aleister Crowley as Adept of Adepts.

He fought in the First World War, gaining the rank of lieutenant in the service of the Welsh Guards. During the Second World War with MI8, his responsibility was to monitor carrier pigeons. He carelessly let slip on occasion departmental secrets to two girl guides and was court martialled but not sent to jail or worse.

In 1929, he unsuccessfully stood as the Conservative candidate for Limehouse. After the death of his father, in May 1934, he took possession of the family seat of Tredegar House, near Newport, where he lived alone with a menagerie of animals and birds. He dedicated one room, his 'magik room', to his study of the occult.

Morgan provided inspiration for the characters of Ivor Lombard in Aldous Huxley's 1921 Crome Yellow, and for Eddie Monteith in Ronald Firbank's The Flower Beneath the Foot.

He was decorated with the following awards:
 Knight of Honour and Devotion, Sovereign and Military Order of Malta
 Knight of Justice, Constantinian Order of St. George
 Knight of Justice, Order of St. John of Jerusalem (KJStJ)
 Commander, Order of the Holy Sepulchre (with star)

In 1937 or 1938 Edith Mary Hinchley painted him. This painting is in the National Trust collection.

Marriages

Despite his known homosexuality, he married twice.

 Lois Ina Sturt (1900–1937), an actress and daughter of Humphrey Napier Sturt, 2nd Baron Alington of Crichel and Lady Feodorowna Yorke, on 1 April 1928. She died in 1937.
 Princess Olga Sergeivna Dolgorouky (1915–1998), daughter of General Prince Serge Alexandrovitch Dolgorouky and Irina Vassilievna Narishkina, on 13 March 1939; this union was annulled in 1943.

Death
He died suddenly on 27 April 1949 at age 55, without issue, and his viscountcy became extinct, although the title of Baron Tredegar passed to his 76-year-old Uncle Frederick. To avoid death duties Tredegar House passed straight to Frederick's son John, the 6th Baron, who soon afterwards sold it to the Sisters of St Joseph.

His mother died in London in 1949, only a few months later.

Works
Fragments
Gold and Ochre
At Dawn
The Eel
The City of Canals

See also

Ruperra Castle
Godfrey Morgan, 1st Viscount Tredegar

References

1893 births
1949 deaths
People educated at Eton College
Alumni of Christ Church, Oxford
20th-century Welsh poets
British Army personnel of World War I
British Army personnel of World War II
Conservative Party (UK) hereditary peers
Converts to Roman Catholicism
LGBT peers
Welsh gay writers
Welsh LGBT poets
Welsh LGBT politicians
LGBT Roman Catholics
Gay poets
Welsh male poets
Papal chamberlains
Knights of Malta
Viscounts in the Peerage of the United Kingdom
Welsh occultists
Fellows of the Royal Society of Literature
20th-century male writers
20th-century occultists
Welsh Guards officers
Royal Corps of Signals officers
British Home Guard officers
London Regiment officers
Royal Engineers officers
LGBT military personnel